A robe is a loose-fitting outer garment.

Robe may also refer to:

Places

Australia
Robe, South Australia, a town and locality on the southeast coast of South Australia
Robe wine region, a wine region adjoining the town of Robe in South Australia
County of Robe, a cadastral unit in of South Australia

Ethiopia
 Bale Robe, also spelled Roobee, a town in the Bale Zone of Oromia, Ethiopia
 Apostolic Prefecture of Robe, a Latin Catholic pre-diocesan jurisdiction with see in the above? below city
 Robe, Arsi, the capital of the Robe Aanaa in the Arsi Zone of Oromia, Ethiopia
 Robe (Aanaa), a Aanaa (district) in the Arsi Zone of Oromia, Ethiopia

Elsewhere
Robe, Washington, a community in the United States

Rivers
Robe River (Australia), a river flowing in Western Australia
Robe River (Ethiopia), which flows through the Robe woreda in the Arsi Zone of Oromia Region, Ethiopia
Robe River (Ireland), in Mayo, Ireland

People
Annie Robe (1866–1922), actress
Frederick Robe (1801–1871), the fourth Governor of South Australia
Leighanne Robe (born 1993), English women's footballer
Roberto Iniesta (born 1962), frontman of the Spanish rock band Extremoduro

Other uses
Informal name for a wardrobe

See also
The Robe (disambiguation)
Robe River (disambiguation)